Jorge Abelardo Eiras (born 7 August 1942) is an Argentine alpine skier. He competed at the 1960 Winter Olympics and the 1964 Winter Olympics.

References

1942 births
Living people
Argentine male alpine skiers
Olympic alpine skiers of Argentina
Alpine skiers at the 1960 Winter Olympics
Alpine skiers at the 1964 Winter Olympics
Skiers from Buenos Aires